Alexeyevka is a rural locality (a settlement) in Utyansky Selsoviet, Khabarsky District, Altai Krai, Russia. The population was 165 as of 2013. It was founded in 1905. There are 3 streets.

Geography 
Alexeyevka is located near the Burla river, 5 km west of Khabary (the district's administrative centre) by road. Utyanka is the nearest rural locality.

References 

Rural localities in Khabarsky District